Desmos is an advanced graphing calculator implemented as a web application and a mobile application written in JavaScript.

History 
It was founded by Eli Luberoff, a math and physics double major from Yale University, and was launched as a startup at TechCrunch's Disrupt New York conference in 2011. , it had received around 1 million US dollars of funding from Kapor Capital, Learn Capital, Kindler Capital,  Elm Street Ventures and Google Ventures. 

In May 2022, Amplify acquired the Desmos curriculum and teacher.desmos.com. Some 50 employees joined Amplify. Desmos Studio was spun off as a separate public benefit corporation focused on building calculator products and other math tools.

The name Desmos came from the Greek word  which means a bond or a tie.

Features 
In addition to graphing both equations and inequalities, it also features lists, plots, regressions, interactive variables, graph restriction, simultaneous graphing, piece wise function graphing, polar function graphing, two types of graphing grids – among other computational features commonly found in a programmable calculator. It can also be used in several languages. Calculus operations such as derivatives and integrals are also available, although direct limits are currently absent. Integrations to positive and negative infinity are supported, and series can also be raised to sufficiently high iterations. Other functions like trigonometric and other transcendental functions, as well as the error function, factorial, statistical operations such as the normal distribution, chi-squared, the aforementioned regressions, and the random function, have also been introduced since 2020.

Users can create accounts and save the graphs and plots that they have created to them. A permalink can then be generated which allow users to share their graphs and elect to be considered for staff picks. The tool comes pre-programmed with 36 different example graphs for the purpose of teaching new users about the tool and the mathematics involved.

Another popular use of the calculator involves the creation of graphic arts using equations and inequalities. The calculator also has an audiotrace function, which can be used to make music. As of April 2017, Desmos also released a browser-based 2D interactive geometry tool, with supporting features including the plotting of points, lines, circles, and polygons. Some of these projects have included features such as 3D via parameterization, and with the use of RGB and HSV coloring introduced in late 2020, artwork with custom coloring, as well as the domain coloring of complex functions. With new performance updates, graphs that include the Mandelbrot set and the Ducks fractal can be made on Desmos. Features such as simulations and tickers also allowed users to create functional interactive games. The usage of these features can be found in Desmos's annual art contest.

Desmos also offers other services: the Scientific Calculator, Four Function Calculator, Matrix Calculator and Geometry Tool.

Applications 
A modified version of the calculator has been used in standardized tests, such as the State of Texas Assessments of Academic Readiness test, the Virginia Standards of Learning (SOL), and the California Assessment of Student Performance and Progress (CAASPP). Activity modules for classrooms can be created through a teacher account, which allow instructors to view students' work and response in real-time.

Its business model involves premium Desmos Math Curriculum and paid partnerships with publishers, assessment companies, and educational institutions.

References

External links

See also
GeoGebra
Wolfram Alpha

Graphing calculator software
Organizations based in San Francisco
JavaScript software
Internet properties established in 2011